Valley Stream is a village in Nassau County, on Long Island, in New York, United States. The population in the Village of Valley Stream was 37,511 at the 2010 census. 

The incorporated Village of Valley Stream is within the Town of Hempstead, along the border with Queens, and is served by the Long Island Rail Road at the Valley Stream, Gibson, and Westwood stations. Money Magazine ranked Valley Stream as "the best place to live in New York" for 2017.

History
In the year 1640, 14 years after the arrival of Dutch colonists in Manhattan (New Amsterdam), the area that is now Valley Stream was purchased by the Dutch West India Company from Rockaway Native Americans (they were a Lenape, or Delaware, band, known by the place where they lived).

With populations concentrated to the west, this woodland area was not developed for the next two centuries. The census of 1840 lists approximately 20 families, most of whom owned large farms. At that time, the northwest section was called "Fosters Meadow". What is now the business section on Rockaway Avenue was called "Rum Junction", because of its taverns. The racy northern section was known as "Cookie Hill", and the section of the northeast that housed the local fertilizer plant was called "Skunks Misery". Hungry Harbor, a section that has retained its name, was home to a squatters' community.Robert Pagan was born in Scotland on December 3, 1796. In or about the late 1830s, Robert, his wife Ellen, and their children emigrated from Scotland. On the journey to the United States, one of their children died and was buried at sea. The 1840 U.S. Census for Queens County lists Pagan's occupation as a farmer. Two children were born to Robert and Ellen Pagan after they settled in the Town of Hempstead.

At this time, the community did not have a post office, so residents had to pick up their mail in the village of Hempstead. After Pagan petitioned authorities for a post office, he was appointed postmaster and it was based in his farmhouse, now known as the Pagan-Fletcher House. He was advised that the community needed a name. Pagan chose "Valley Stream" based on the topographical appearance of the area. In 1843, the U.S. Post Office formally accepted the name of Valley Stream. As a consequence, Pagan is credited with naming the community. Pagan died on March 25, 1870.

His wife, Ellen, also played a significant role in early village history. Tired of traveling to Lynbrook for religious services, she began holding services in her home. A Methodist minister was hired for periodic stops at the Pagan home, and the first congregation in Valley Stream was founded.

In 1853, Hempstead Turnpike was the only road that connected Valley Stream to Jamaica and New York City. The main streets in Valley Stream that connected the small village to the turnpike were Mill Road (which is Corona Avenue today) in the west, Sand Street (Central Avenue) in the south, and Dutch Broadway in the north. That year Merrick Road, a planked, one-lane road, was constructed through Valley Stream, connecting the village to Merrick in the east and Jamaica to the west. With the new thoroughfare in the area, Valley Stream residents and industry began to move southward.

In 1869, the South Side Railroad began stopping in Valley Stream and a branch of the railroad was constructed to connect the main line with the Rockaways. The new branch is now called the Far Rockaway Branch of the Long Island Railroad.

The new railroad, combined with the emergence of Merrick Road as a major artery, stimulated growth in Valley Stream, and it became a substantial community. Around the start of the 20th century, Hendrickson Park was a prime vacationing destination for people from Brooklyn and Queens. The Valley Stream Hotel opened at the beginning of the 20th century, overlooking the golf course. Many tourists who came to visit wound up moving to Valley Stream. The Village of Valley Stream was incorporated on February 14 1925 as a result of its growth.

In 1922, developer William R. Gibson came to Valley Stream after building more than 2,500 houses in Queens. He bought  of land on Roosevelt Avenue and built homes on Avondale, Berkeley, Cambridge, Derby, and Elmwood streets. Many descendants of immigrants moved into the area. Five years later, he expanded his development to Cochran Place and Dartmouth Street. Realizing that his development was perfectly designed for white-collar commuters, he petitioned the Long Island Railroad for a stop. The LIRR agreed to stop in the area if Gibson built the station himself. On May 29, 1929, the Gibson station was opened. Gibson station, as it became known, retains the name of its founder.

In 1984, President Ronald Reagan addressed Temple Hillel in Valley Stream at the invitation of Rabbi Morris Friedman, father of Ambassador David Friedman, which was the first time since President George Washington a sitting American President addressed a Jewish congregation at their house of worship.

Geography

Communities bordering Valley Stream are Elmont (home of Belmont Park racetrack), Lynbrook, Malverne, Franklin Square, Hewlett, Woodmere, and Rosedale (a neighborhood in Queens in New York City).

Demographics

As of the census of 2010, there were 37,511 people, 12,484 households, and 9,600 families residing in the village. The population density was 10,569.5 people per square mile (4,081.9/km2). There were 12,688 housing units at an average density of 3,687.5 per square mile (1,424.1/km2). The racial make up of the village was 57.25% White, 18.57% African American, 0.3% Native American, 11.38% Asian, 8.97% from other races and 3.47% from two or more races. Hispanic or Latino were 22.24% of the population. The median household income was $62,243 and the family income was $72,585.
Median household income for the village was $77,905, and the median income for a family was $84,273.

Males had a median income of $80,094 versus $56,260 for females. The per capita income for the CDP was $66,334. About 1.0% of families and 1.8% of the population were below the poverty line, including 1.4% of those under age 18 and 0.4% of those age 65 or over.

There were 12,484 households, of which 33.9% had children under the age of 18 living with them, 61.5% were married couples living together, 11.5% had a female householder with no husband present, and 23.1% were non-families. 20.2% of all households were made up of individuals, and 11.3% had someone living alone who was 65 years of age or older. The average household size was 2.91 and the average family size was 3.37.

In the village, the population was spread out, with 23.5% under the age of 18, 7.7% from 18 to 24, 29.1% from 25 to 44, 23.4% from 45 to 64, and 16.3% who were 65 years of age or older. The median age was 39 years. For every 100 females, there were 91.4 males. For every 100 females age 18 and over, there were 87.0 males.

The village is home to significant Italian American, Irish American and German American populations, with 31.8% of the population identifying themselves as being of Italian ancestry in the 2000 Census.

Transportation

Road 

 
 Peninsula Boulevard (CR 2)
 Mill Road/Central Avenue
 Merrick Road

Bus 

 n1: Elmont & East Rockaway
 n4: Jamaica & Freeport
 n2 & n8: New Hyde Park & Green Acres Mall
 n25: Great Neck Plaza & Lynbrook
 Q5: Jamaica & Green Acres Mall
 Q85: Locust Manor & Green Acres Mall
 Q111: Jamaica & South Valley Stream

Rail 

 LIRR Far Rockaway Branch: Valley Stream, Gibson.
 LIRR Long Beach Branch: Valley Stream
 LIRR West Hempstead Branch: Valley Stream, Westwood.

Education
Valley Stream has many separate elementary school districts (the Valley Stream 13, 24, and 30 Union Free School Districts) which share the same central high school district: the Valley Stream CHSD.

In addition, children living in some of the southern portions of the Village are instead zoned to attend the Hewlett-Woodmere Union Free School District's schools.

Hewlett-Woodmere Union Free School District 
 Ogden Elementary School
 Hewlett Elementary School
 Woodmere Middle School
 George W. Hewlett High School

Valley Stream School Union Free School District #13 
 Howell Road Elementary School
 James A. Dever Elementary School (Originally Corona Ave Elementary School)
 Wheeler Avenue Elementary School
 Willow Road Elementary School

Valley Stream Union Free School District #24 
 Brooklyn Avenue Elementary School
 Robert W. Carbonaro Elementary School
 William L. Buck Elementary School

Valley Stream Union Free School District #30 
 Clear Stream Avenue Elementary School
 Forest Road Elementary School
 Shaw Avenue Elementary School

Valley Stream Central High School District

 Valley Stream Central High School
 Valley Stream Memorial Junior High School
 Valley Stream North High School
 Valley Stream South High School

Economy

 Green Acres Mall is located in Valley Stream.
 National Amusements Movie Theater chain started in Valley Stream.
 Ninety-Nines were started in Valley Stream.
 Snapple Beverage Co., and the drink itself, started in Valley Stream.

Films
Portions of the films Married to the Mob, Goodfellas, Trees Lounge, The Brothers McMullen, The Lords of Flatbush, Frankenhooker and Desperate Endeavors were filmed in Valley Stream. Also, Valley Stream is the setting for a section of The Honeymoon Killers. The Netflix show Maniac, and Ed Burns show Bridge and Tunnel (TV series) filmed some scenes in Valley Stream.

Notable people

 Fred Armisen, actor/comedian, raised in Valley Stream
 Lon Babby, president of the Phoenix Suns, grew up in Valley Stream 
 Andy Dolich, sports executive, grew up in Valley Stream
 Peter Barton, actor, raised in Valley Stream
 Bruce Blakeman, politician, lawyer raised in Valley Stream
 Stephen Boyd, professional football player, raised in Valley Stream
 Michael Brandon, actor, raised in Valley Stream
 Jason Michael Brescia, director, raised in Valley Stream
 Edward Burns, actor and director, grew up in Valley Stream and continues to film projects there. 
 Brian Burns, actor, raised in Gibson (brother of Edward Burns)
 Jim Breuer, actor/comedian, raised in Valley Stream
 Steve Buscemi, actor/director, grew up in Valley Stream
 Eileen Charbonneau, novelist, grew up in Valley Stream
 Patricia Charbonneau, actress, grew up in Valley Stream
 Carolyn Craig, actress, known for House on Haunted Hill and Giant (1956 film). Born in Valley Stream 
 Jordan Dingle (born 2000), college basketball player for the Penn Quakers of the Ivy League.
 Everlast, singer and rapper, born in Valley Stream
 Fern Fitzgerald, actress. born in Valley Stream
 Jeffrey M. Friedman, scientist, discoverer of Leptin, raised in Valley Stream
 Mary Gordon, author, lived as a youth and attended elementary school in Valley Stream
 Tom Gorman, baseball player. Resident of Valley Stream at time of his death.
 Gene Gotti, mobster and brother of former Gambino Crime Family Boss John Gotti, lived in Valley Stream.
 Henry Hill, former mob associate with the Lucchese crime family, whose life in the mob was documented in the book Wiseguy: Life in a Mafia Family by Nicholas Pileggi, which was later adopted into the Martin Scorsese film Goodfellas, lived in Valley Stream.
 Steve Hytner, actor, grew up in Valley Stream
 Al Iaquinta, fighter on The Ultimate Fighter, grew up in Valley Stream
 George E. Killian, president of FISU, born and raised in Valley Stream
 Esther Jungreis, founder of Hineni, lived in Valley Stream
 Wendy Kaufman aka The Snapple Lady, spokesperson for Snapple, grew up in Valley Stream
 Cyndi Lauper lived on the west side of Valley Stream before becoming famous. 
 Larry Miller, comedian and actor, grew up in Valley Stream
 Leslie Moonves, Former president of CBS, grew up in Valley Stream
 Deborah Oppenheimer Academy Award-winning film and television producer, grew up in Valley Stream
 Rita Moreno lived in North Valley Stream.
 Steve Orich, Tony-nominated orchestrator, grew up in Valley Stream
 Orio Palmer, fireman who died while rescuing World Trade Center occupants on 9/11
 Naomi Osaka, professional tennis player, grew up in Valley Stream
 Ralph Penza, TV news correspondent, grew up in Valley Stream
 Edward Renehan, writer, grew up in Valley Stream
 Owen Roizman, Oscar-winning cinematographer, grew up in Valley Stream
 Matt Rubano, bassist for Taking Back Sunday, born in Valley Stream
 Adam Schefter, NFL reporter for ESPN, grew up in Valley Stream
 Shaggy, reggae singer, lives in Valley Stream
 Greg Smith, bassist/vocalist for Ted Nugent, Alice Cooper, and Rainbow, grew up in Valley Stream
 Robin Wilson, lead singer for the Gin Blossoms, lives in Valley Stream

References

External links

 Valley Stream official website
 Henry Waldinger Memorial Library
 Valley Stream Historical Society Pagan-Fletcher Restoration
 Valley Stream: The Bicycling Craze Rolled Into Town

 
Villages in New York (state)
Villages in Nassau County, New York